Dennis Rommedahl (born 22 July 1978) is a Danish former professional footballer who played as a right winger. The second-most capped national player for Denmark, he appeared in 126 matches and scored 21 goals for his country, and was a member of the Danish squads at the 2002 World Cup, Euro 2004, the 2010 World Cup and Euro 2012. He was nominated for Danish Footballer of the Year in 2007, but did not win the award until 2010.

Club career
Rommedahl was born in the Bispebjerg borough of Copenhagen. He played youth football for a number of clubs, including B. 93 and Lyngby. He made his senior debut in 1995 for Lyngby, playing in the Danish Superliga.

PSV Eindhoven and RKC Waalwijk
In 1997, he was acquired by PSV Eindhoven, where he made his debut on 22 March in a 1–0 home loss against Heerenveen. After his second match, PSV loaned him to RKC Waalwijk for the 1997–98 season. He returned to PSV in 1998 where he became a success by outrunning defenders and providing dangerous crosses from the wing. He was a member of the PSV squad that won four Eredivisie championships and four Johan Cruijff Shields.

Charlton Athletic
Rommedahl moved from Dutch to English football in the summer 2004 when he signed a four-year contract for Premier League side Charlton Athletic. His first season was spent settling in at The Valley, with a notable length of time spent on the substitute's bench and on the physiotherapist's table. During his second season, he took a leading role in helping Charlton climb the ladder in the Premier League.

Rommedahl was linked with several moves away from Charlton. In the summer of 2006, he was nearly sold to Zenit St. Petersburg. In December 2006, he was linked with a £1 million move to F.C. Copenhagen. This link was resurrected as Charlton edged closer to relegation, with Rommedahl being discussed as a replacement for Michael Silberbauer, who was expected to leave Denmark to join a foreign club. In the summer of 2007, Galatasaray and Getafe expressed interest in signing him. However, he finally left Charlton on 20 July 2007, moving to Ajax for fee of £680,000.

Ajax and NEC
With Ajax, Rommedahl immediately won his fifth career Johan Cruijff Shield in a 1–0 win over his former team, PSV Eindhoven. He was also one of five players nominated for the Danish Football Player of the Year in 2007. For the second half of the 2008–09 season, he went out on loan to NEC. He finished his Ajax-career at the end of the season 2009–10.

Olympiacos
In July 2010, Rommedahl signed a two-year contract with Super League Greece club Olympiacos. On 30 August 2011, Olympiacos released Rommedahl to find another club.

Brøndby
Rommedahl joined Brøndby on 30 August 2011 on a free transfer, signing a two-year contract and was given the number 11 shirt.

RKC Waalwijk
Rommedahl signed with RKC Waalwijk in the summer of 2013. Because of injuries he had never played an official match before he dissolved his contract with the club in January 2015.

International career

Rommedahl was selected to play for the Danish under-19 national youth team in July 1996. He went on to play a combined 19 matches and score five goals for the under-19 and under-21 national youth teams.

After the appointment of Morten Olsen, Rommedahl was immediately called up for his Denmark senior national team debut in August 2000. He played the next 38 Danish national team matches in a row, the first 32 games in the starting line-up. The 38 games included Denmark's four games at the 2002 FIFA World Cup, where he scored against defending world champions France in Denmark's 2–0 victory. He also played all four Danish matches at the Euro 2004. His unbroken run of national team games ended in February 2004 when he missed the friendly against Turkey.

On 28 May 2010, Olsen announced that Rommedhal would be part of the final squad of 23 participating in the 2010 World Cup. He assisted Nicklas Bendtner's goal, and scored the winner himself, in a group stage game against Cameroon on 19 June 2010. Rommedahl was also inducted in the final squad for Euro 2012, where he once again participated in all of the Danish group matches.

On 9 October 2014, after a long-term injury, Rommedahl announced that he would officially retire from the national team. He was given a farewell ceremony before Denmark's match against Portugal on 14 October 2014.

Career statistics

Club

International 
Scores and results list Denmark's goal tally first, score column indicates score after each Rommedahl goal.

Honours
PSV
 Eredivisie: 1996–97, 1999–2000, 2000–01, 2002–03
 Johan Cruijff Shield: 2000, 2001, 2003

Ajax
 KNVB Cup: 2009–10
 Johan Cruijff Shield: 2007

Olympiacos
 Super League Greece: 2010–11

Individual
Danish Football Association's award (2): 2007, 2010 
UEFA awards 100 caps: 2011

See also
 List of men's footballers with 100 or more international caps

References

External links

 Dennis Rommedahl at Voetbal International 

Complete League statistics at danskfodbold.com 
FootballDatabase.com career stats

1978 births
Living people
Footballers from Copenhagen
Danish men's footballers
Association football wingers
Denmark international footballers
Denmark youth international footballers
Denmark under-21 international footballers
Lyngby Boldklub players
PSV Eindhoven players
RKC Waalwijk players
Charlton Athletic F.C. players
AFC Ajax players
NEC Nijmegen players
Olympiacos F.C. players
Danish Superliga players
Eredivisie players
Premier League players
Super League Greece players
2002 FIFA World Cup players
UEFA Euro 2004 players
Danish expatriate men's footballers
Danish expatriate sportspeople in the Netherlands
Expatriate footballers in the Netherlands
Danish expatriate sportspeople in England
Expatriate footballers in England
Danish expatriate sportspeople in Greece
Expatriate footballers in Greece
2010 FIFA World Cup players
UEFA Euro 2012 players
FIFA Century Club